Festa on Ice is a figure skating show that IB Sports produced. 2010 Winter Olympic champion Kim Yuna is a former client of IB Sports, which is a sports agency based on Seoul, South Korea.

2010 Festa on Ice
The 2010 Festa on Ice was held at the Olympic Gymnastics Arena in Seoul, South Korea on April 16–18, 2010. 2010 FOI was directed by Brian Orser and choreographed by David Wilson.

The cast for 2010
 Kim Yuna
 Kwak Min-jeong
 Shae-Lynn Bourne
 Kiira Korpi
 Brian Orser
 Patrick Chan
 Tomáš Verner
 Brian Joubert
 Ilia Kulik
 Zhang Hao & Zhang Dan
 Oksana Domnina & Maxim Shabalin
 Edrea Khong & Edbert Khong

Programs

ACT 1
Opening
Kim Yuna - "I Believe" by Nikki Yanofsky
All Skaters - "I Gotta Feeling" by The Black Eyed Peas
Tomáš Verner - "Volare" by  Gipsy Kings
Kwak Min-jeong - "Marshmallow" by IU
Brian Joubert - "Madeleine" by Jacques Brel
Kiira Korpi - "Butterfly" by Rajaton
Dan Zhang & Hao Zhang - "Moulin Rouge!", soundtrack by Craig Armstrong & Marius de Vries
Patrick Chan - "Viva La Vida" by Coldplay
Ilia Kulik - "Mad" by Ne-Yo
Shae-Lynn Bourne - "Bridge Over Troubled Water" by Simon & Garfunkel
Oksana Domnina & Maxim Shabalin - "Aboriginal Dance" arrangement by Alexander Goldstin
Kim Yuna - "Méditation" from Thaïs by Jules Massenet
Closing - "Theme from Mission Impossible" by Adam Clayton
Men's Skater : Ilia Kulik, Brian Joubert, Patrick Chan, Tomáš Verner, Hao Zhang

ACT 2
Opening -  "Run Devil Run" by Girls' Generation
Ladies' Skater : Kim Yuna,  Shae-Lynn Bourne,  Kiira Korpi,  Dan Zhang,  Kwak Min-jeong
Edrea Khong & Edbert Khong - "Let's Get Loud" by Jennifer Lopez
Kiira Korpi - "If I Were A Boy" by Beyoncé
Patrick Chan - "Don't Worry, Be Happy" by Bobby McFerrin
Tomáš Verner - "Always Look on the Bright Side of Life" by Monty Python
Kwak Min-jeong - "The Voice Within" by Christina Aguilera
Oksana Domnina & Maxim Shabalin - The Matrix soundtrack by Don Davis
Brian Joubert - "Sandstorm" by Darude
Shae-Lynn Bourne - "The Sound of San Francisco" by the Global Deejays
Ilia Kulik - "Mustang Nismo" by Brian Tyler
Dan Zhang & Hao Zhang - "Almost Here" by Delta Goodrem & Brian McFadden
Brian Orser - "Thunderball & Into Miami/Alpine Drive"
Kim Yuna - "007 James Bond Medley" by Monty Norman, John Barry and David Arnold
Finale - "Abracadabra" by Brown Eyed Girls
Encore  - "Magic" by Brown Eyed Girls

2009 Festa on Ice
The 2009 Festa on Ice was held at the KINTEX center in Goyang City, Gyeonggi Province, in South Korea on April 24–26, 2009. 2009 FOI was directed by Brian Orser and choreographed by David Wilson and Lho Ji-Hyun. The tickets were sold out in just 20 minutes.

The cast for 2009

 Kim Yuna
 Shin Yea-Ji
 Yun Yea-ji
 Kim Min-seok
 Shizuka Arakawa
 Alissa Czisny
 Patrick Chan
 Stéphane Lambiel
 Adam Rippon
 Jeremy Abbott
 Johnny Weir
 Zhang Hao & Zhang Dan
 Tessa Virtue & Scott Moir

Special guests
Big Mama - Female singing group
Gambler Crew - B-boy team
Son Yeon-Jae - Rhythmic Gymnast

Episode
During the show, all skaters enjoyed a traditional Korean game called "gongginori", which some of the Korean skaters taught to the other skaters.

Programs
The 2009 Festa on Ice was different from other ice shows. FOI installed a large screen and showed video arts for the exhibitions of skaters. Performers of the show presented unique programs such as a battle between B-boys and skaters.

ACT 1

Son Yeon-Jae - "Walking in the Air" by Nightwish
Opening
 Kim Yuna & Stéphane Lambiel - "The Point of No Return" from the musical The Phantom of the Opera
 All skaters - "Masquerade"
 Introduction of all skaters - "The Phantom of the Opera"
Shin Yea-Ji - "You Rock My World", "Beat It" by Michael Jackson
Adam Rippon - "Desperado" by Westlife
Dan Zhang & Hao Zhang - "Riding on the Wings of Songs" by Felix Mendelssohn
Kim Min-seok - "Maria" from the musical West Side Story
Jeremy Abbott - "Gotta Get Thru This (Acoustic Version)" by Daniel Bedingfield
Alissa Czisny - "Bridge over Troubled Water" by Simon & Garfunkel
Patrick Chan - "Viva La Vida" by Coldplay
Johnny Weir - "넌 감동이었어 (You Made Me Impressed)" by Sung Si Kyung
Tessa Virtue & Scott Moir - "Won't You Charleston with Me" from the musical The Boy Friend
Stéphane Lambiel - "Un Giorno Per Noi" by Musical Giulietta e Romeo
Shizuka Arakawa - "Frozen" by Madonna
Kim Yuna - "Don't Stop the Music" by Rihanna
Men skaters & Gambler Crew - "Mirotic" by 동방신기, "10점 만점에 10점(10 out of 10)" by 2PM

ACT 2

Team Blessing (Synchronized skating)  - "Good Morning Baltimore" by Musical Hairspray
Lady skaters - "Mamma Mia" from the musical Mamma Mia!
Yun Yea-ji - "Memory" from the musical Cats
Adam Rippon - "I'm Yours" by Jason Mraz
Alissa Czisny - "The Swan" by Camille Saint-Saëns
Dan Zhang & Hao Zhang - "Canto Della Terra" by Sarah Brightman & Andrea Bocelli
Jeremy Abbott - "Treat"  by Carlos Santana
Johnny Weir - "Poker Face" by Lady Gaga
Patrick Chan - "Time to Say Goodbye" by Andrea Bocelli
Tessa Virtue & Scott Moir - "The Great Gig in the Sky" by Pink Floyd
Shizuka Arakawa - "Listen" by Beyoncé
Stéphane Lambiel - "Tainted Love" by Paul Young
Kim Yuna - "Gold" by Big Mama
Finale - "Dancing Queen" by Big Mama
Encore - "It's Raining Men" by Big Mama

2008 Festa on Ice
2008 Festa on Ice was held on May 17–18, 2008 in the Mokdong Ice Rink in Seoul, South Korea. 2008 FOI was directed by Brian Orser and choreographed by David Wilson.

The cast for 2008

The cast for 2008 FOI was the following:

 Kim Yuna
 Shin Ye-Ji
 Yun Yea-ji
 Lee Dong-won
 Shizuka Arakawa
 Sarah Meier
 Patrick Chan
 Daisuke Takahashi
 Nobunari Oda
 Johnny Weir
 Rachel Kirkland & Eric Radford
 Dan Zhang & Hao Zhang
 Aliona Savchenko & Robin Szolkowy
 Tessa Virtue & Scott Moir

References

External links
 Festa on Ice - Official site

Ice shows